The Museo Nacional de Arqueología y Etnología (MUNAE; National Museum of Archaeology and Ethnology) is a national museum of Guatemala, dedicated to the conservation of archaeological and ethnological artifacts and research into Guatemala's history and cultural heritage. The museum is located in Guatemala City, at Finca La Aurora.

History and collections 
First created by a governmental decree on 30 June 1898, the institution and collections of MUNAE relocated premises several times subsequently, until they were established in its present building in 1946. The museum has some 3000 square meters of exhibition space, and 1500 sq.m. devoted to restorative and research purposes. MUNAE's collections amount to some 20 thousand archaeological artifacts and 5 thousand ethnological items.

In October 2021, an ancient Mayan stele was returned to the museum by a private collector in France. This stele had been stolen from the Piedras Negras site in the 1960s. It reappeared in Paris in 2019 during an auction. Thanks to the joint mobilization of Guatemala, France and UNESCO, the sale was suspended and mediation initiated. The authorities in Guatemala could prove its provenance, upon which the French owner dropped the intended sale in favour for the artwork's return.

References

External links 

 Official website

Mesoamerican art museums
Museums in Guatemala
Guetamala
Buildings and structures in Guatemala City
Archaeological museums in Guatemala
Museums established in 1898
1898 establishments in Guatemala